The American Falls is the second-largest of the three waterfalls that together are known as Niagara Falls on the Niagara River along the Canada–U.S. border. Unlike the much larger Horseshoe Falls, of which approximately 90% is in Ontario, Canada and 10% in the U.S. state of New York, the American Falls is entirely within the United States.

Characteristics

The falls receive approximately 11% of the flow from Niagara River, with most of the rest going over Horseshoe Falls, from which it is separated by Goat Island.

This measurement is taken from the top of the Falls to top of the rock pile (talus).

Visitors can view the falls from a steep angle on the American side, where it is possible to approach to within several meters of the edge of the falls. One can view the falls from the bank of the river, as well as on Goat Island and Luna Island, which are accessible by a pedestrian bridge that crosses the rapids of the Niagara River upstream from the falls. The falls are viewable head-on from the Canadian side in Niagara Falls, Ontario.

The ledge of the American Falls is shaped in a modified "W" form, caused by numerous rock falls over the past 150 years which have resulted in the huge mound of rock at its base. The most notable recent rockfall occurred in 1954 with the collapse of Prospect Point to the north.

To survey the rockfall and determine how to prevent the falls from becoming a series of rapids, the U.S. Army Corps of Engineers blocked the flow of water over the American Falls from June to November 1969. Results conflict as to whether tourist attendance that season was higher or lower than normal. Attendance increases were likely due to the news the cataract was dried off; decreases in tourists could be attributed to people believing both cataracts (the American and Horseshoe Falls) were dewatered. By December 1969, water was flowing over the American Falls again. In the mid‑1970s, it was decided not to make alterations to the rockwall, citing the trend to allow nature to take its course.

References

External links

Images from the Historic Niagara Digital Collections
Art works in the collection of the Niagara Falls Public Library
Dewatering timeline

Niagara Falls
Waterfalls of New York (state)
Protected areas of Niagara County, New York
Tourist attractions in Niagara County, New York
Block waterfalls
Niagara Falls State Park
Landforms of Niagara County, New York